Ivan Romanovich Maklakov (born 17 April 1998) is a Russian football player. He plays for FC Chernomorets Novorossiysk.

Club career
He made his debut for the main PFC CSKA Moscow squad on 10 October 2018 in a Russian Cup game against FC Tyumen.

In February 2019, he moved to FC Zenit-2 Saint Petersburg. He made his debut in the Russian Football National League for Zenit-2 on 24 March 2019 in a game against FC Khimki.

On 18 June 2019, he signed a 3-year contract with FC Baltika Kaliningrad.

References

External links
 

1998 births
People from Orekhovo-Zuyevo
Sportspeople from Moscow Oblast
Living people
Russian footballers
Association football defenders
Russia youth international footballers
PFC CSKA Moscow players
FC Zenit-2 Saint Petersburg players
FC Baltika Kaliningrad players
FC Shinnik Yaroslavl players
FC Chernomorets Novorossiysk players
Russian First League players